The 5th World Championships in Athletics, under the auspices of the International Association of Athletics Federations, were held at the Ullevi Stadium, Gothenburg, Sweden on 5–13 August 1995.

This edition featured 1804 athletes from 191 nations.

This competition saw the women run the 5000 m event at the World Championships for the first time. The race replaced the 3000 m event which had been run at all previous World Championships.

Men's results

Track
1991 | 1993 | 1995 | 1997 | 1999

Note: * Indicates athletes who ran in preliminary rounds.

Field
1991 | 1993 | 1995 | 1997 | 1999

Women's results

Track
1991 | 1993 | 1995 | 1997 | 1999

Note: * Indicates athletes who ran in preliminary rounds.

Field
1991 | 1993 | 1995 | 1997 | 1999

Medal table
Note that the host, Sweden, did not win any medals at these championships.  This fate Sweden shares only with Canada (2001).

References
 IAAF 1995 Championship

 
World Athletics Championships
International sports competitions in Gothenburg
W
International athletics competitions hosted by Sweden
World Championships
August 1995 sports events in Europe
1990s in Gothenburg
Athletics in Gothenburg